Sourzac is a commune in the Dordogne department in Nouvelle-Aquitaine in southwestern France.

Population

International relations
Twinned with Vigy since 1991.

See also
Communes of the Dordogne département

References

Communes of Dordogne